Miss Universe 2020 was the 69th Miss Universe pageant, held at the Seminole Hard Rock Hotel & Casino in Hollywood, Florida, United States on May 16, 2021.

At the end of the event, Zozibini Tunzi of South Africa crowned Andrea Meza of Mexico as Miss Universe 2020. It is Mexico's first victory in 10 years, and the third victory of the country in the pageant's history.

Contestants from 74 countries and territories competed in this year's pageant, featuring the smallest number of candidates at the pageant since 2003. The competition was hosted by Mario Lopez and Miss Universe 2012 Olivia Culpo; Lopez last served as host during Miss Universe 2007, while Culpo became the first former Miss Universe titleholder to become the pageant's main host. Colombian Paulina Vega and South African Demi-Leigh Tebow served as expert analysts, and the Cheslie Kryst served as a backstage correspondent; they had previously been crowned as Miss Universe 2014, Miss Universe 2017, and Miss USA 2019, respectively. Puerto Rican  singer Luis Fonsi performed.

This edition, to date, is the only time the pageant was broadcast on FYI, after being temporarily off from its regular broadcaster Fox due to the COVID-19 pandemic-related uncertainties to this edition. This was also the only time Steve Harvey did not host the pageant between 2015 and 2021.

Background

Location and date
On March 3, 2021, the Miss Universe Organization announced that the grand final of the 2020 pageant, would be on May 16, 2021, at the Seminole Hard Rock Hotel & Casino in Hollywood, Florida, United States. Due to the COVID-19 pandemic, the competition was postponed three times between November 2020 to May 2021. This edition was the third time in the pageant's history where the event was held after the calendar year ended; this previously occurred during Miss Universe 2014 and Miss Universe 2016, when both took place in January of the following year. The 2020 edition in May of the following year makes it the latest edition in the competition's history.In addition to not having any public money and having to follow security measures, the delegates were prevented from carrying out public activities outside the resort.It was allowed that in addition to the people involved in the production and organization of the contest, a group of 1750 fans of the event could buy packages to be present at the Theater of the Resort to watch the stages of the competition live.This group was near a quarter of the venue's seating total capacity.

Selection of participants
Contestants from 74 countries and territories were selected to compete in the pageant. Due to the pandemic, numerous national pageants were postponed or canceled entirely, resulting in multiple former runners-up from previous national pageants being appointed, or casting processes taking place instead. Twenty-eight of the delegates were appointees, including Argentina, Armenia, Aruba, Bahamas, Barbados, Belize, British Virgin Islands, Bulgaria, Cameroon, Cayman Islands, Curaçao, Czech Republic, Denmark, Dominican Republic, Ghana, Haiti, Honduras, Kazakhstan, Laos, Mauritius, Panama, Portugal, Puerto Rico, Singapore, Slovakia, South Korea and Ukraine.

Three contestants were designees after the withdrawal of the original contestant. Céline Van Ouytsel, Miss Belgium 2020, was expected to represent Belgium but was replaced by Dhenia Covens, the second runner-up of Miss Belgium 2018, due to the COVID-19 pandemic in the United States. Amandine Petit, Miss France 2021, was designated to represent France instead of Clémence Botino, Miss France 2020. The switch happened due to a potential date conflict between Miss Universe 2021 and Miss France 2022 in December 2021. Botino competed in the 2021 edition of the pageant. Magdalena Kasiborska, Miss Polski 2019, was expected to represent Poland but was forced to withdraw after suffering from a spinal disc herniation. Natalia Piguła, the first runner-up of Miss Polski 2019, replaced her. In addition, María Fernanda Aristizábal, Miss Colombia 2019, originally was scheduled to participate in this edition but could not as the Miss Colombia Organization lost the franchise to Miss Universe since June 2020. A new organization called Miss Universe Colombia, led by Natalie Ackermann, will now be in charge of selecting a representative to Miss Universe. Laura Olascuaga was the winner of the first edition of the pageant and represented Colombia in Miss Universe. On April 6, 2022, Aristizábal was appointed as Miss Universe Colombia 2022 and will represent Colombia at Miss Universe 2022.

The 2020 edition saw the debut of Cameroon, and the returns of Ghana and Russia, both of which had not competed since 2018. Tangia Zaman Methila of Bangladesh was set to compete but withdrew from the competition less than a month prior due to the COVID-19 pandemic in Bangladesh and the imposition of additional lockdowns and travel restrictions. In addition to Bangladesh, eighteen other countries and territories, due to the pandemic, including Angola, Egypt, Equatorial Guinea, Georgia, Germany, Guam, Kenya, Lithuania, Mongolia, Namibia, New Zealand, Nigeria, Saint Lucia, Sierra Leone, Sweden, Tanzania, Turkey, and the US Virgin Islands withdrew. The withdrawal of Germany marks the first time it did not compete in the competition since its debut in Miss Universe 1952.

Results

Placements

§ – Voted into the Top 21 by viewers

Special awards

Pageant

Format
Due to restrictive measures related to the COVID-19 pandemic, the Miss Universe Organization implemented specific changes to the format of this edition. The number of semifinalists was increased to 21— the biggest since the pageant's inception in 1952. The results of the preliminary competition and closed-door interviews determined the 20 semifinalists. The semifinalists were selected in a round-robin system instead of the continental format used between 2017 and 2019. Internet voting returned, with fans being able to vote for one candidate to advance into the semifinals, making the number of semifinalists 21. The Top 21 then competed directly in the swimsuit competition and were narrowed down to the top 10 afterward. The top 10 competed in the evening gown competition, and the top 5 were later announced. The top five competed in the question-and-answer round and the closing statement.

Selection committee
Sheryl Adkins-Green – American marketing executive
Arden Cho – American actress
Christine Duffy – American businesswoman
Keltie Knight – Canadian television host
Brook Lee – Miss Universe 1997 from the United States
Deepica Mutyala – American entrepreneur
Tatyana Orozco – Colombian businesswoman
Zuleyka Rivera – Miss Universe 2006 from Puerto Rico

Contestants
74 contestants competed for the title.

Notes

References

External links
 

2020
2020 beauty pageants
2021 beauty pageants
2021 in Florida
2021 in the United States
Beauty pageants in the United States
May 2021 events in the United States
Events postponed due to the COVID-19 pandemic
Miss Universe